Manchester Hulme was a parliamentary constituency in Manchester which returned one Member of Parliament (MP)  to the House of Commons of the Parliament of the United Kingdom from 1918 until it was abolished for the 1950 general election.

Boundaries
The County Borough of Manchester wards of Medlock Street, Moss Side West, and St George's.

Members of Parliament

Election results

Election in the 1910s

Elections in the 1920s

Elections in the 1930s

Elections in the 1940s
General Election 1939–40

Another General Election was required to take place before the end of 1940. The political parties had been making preparations for an election to take place and by the Autumn of 1939, the following candidates had been selected; 
Conservative: Joseph Nall
Labour: G W Dillon
British Union: B T Parkyn

References

Notes

Hulme
Constituencies of the Parliament of the United Kingdom established in 1918
Constituencies of the Parliament of the United Kingdom disestablished in 1950